The Rolls-Royce RB.53 Dart is a turboprop engine designed and manufactured by Rolls-Royce Limited. First run in 1946, it powered the Vickers Viscount on its maiden flight in 1948. A flight on July 29 of that year, which carried 14 paying passengers between Northolt and Paris–Le Bourget Airport in a Dart-powered Viscount, was the first regularly scheduled airline flight by a turbine-powered aircraft. The Viscount was the first turboprop-powered aircraft to enter airline service - British European Airways (BEA) in 1953.

The Dart was still in production forty years later when the last Fokker F27 Friendships and Hawker Siddeley HS 748s were produced in 1987.

Following the company's convention for naming gas turbine engines after rivers, this turboprop engine design was named after the River Dart.

History
Designed in 1946 by a team led by Lionel Haworth, the Dart had a two-stage centrifugal compressor design derived from the earlier Rolls-Royce Clyde. The Dart was initially rated at 890 shp and first flew in October 1947 mounted to the nose of a converted Avro Lancaster. Improvements in the design boosted power output to 1,400 shp in the RDa.3, which went into production for the Viscount in 1952. The RDa.6 increased power to 1,600 shp and the RDa.7 to 1,800 shp by adding another compressor stage.

Later Darts were rated up to 3,245 shp and remained in production until 1987, with approximately 7,100 produced, flying some 170 million hours.

The Dart was also produced under licence in India by Hindustan Aeronautics Limited.

Haworth and his team later went on to design and develop the larger and more powerful Rolls-Royce Tyne.

Variants
As well as the RB.53 designation each mark of Dart engine was allocated a Ministry of Supply (MoS) "RDa.n" number as well as Mk.numbers.
RDa.1 Initial prototype engines – 1,250 shp plus 300lb residual thrust
RDa.2 Initial production engines
RDa.3  estimated power –  shaft power +  residual thrust at 14,500 rpm
RDa.6  estimated power –  shaft power +  residual thrust at 14,500 rpm
RDa.7  estimated power –  shaft power +  residual thrust at 15,000 rpm
RDa.7/1  estimated power –  shaft power +  residual thrust at 15,000 rpm
RDa.7/2  estimated power –  shaft power +  residual thrust at 15,000 rpm
RDa.7 Mk 21  estimated power - used for Bréguet 1050 Alizé
RDa.7/2 Mk.529  estimated power –  shaft power +  residual thrust at 15,000 rpm
RDa.10  estimated power –  shaft power +  residual thrust at 15,000 rpm
RDa.10/1  estimated power –  shaft power +  residual thrust at 15,000 rpm
RDa.10/1  estimated power at 15,000 rpm, with Water/Methanol injection for the Hawker-Siddeley HS.748MF Andover C Mk.1.
RDa.11
Mk.506 (RDa.3)
Mk.510 (RDa.6)
Mk.511 (RDa.6)
Mk.512 (RDa.6)
Mk.514 (RDa.6)
Mk.520 (RDa.7)
Mk.525 (RDa.7/1)
Mk.526 (RDa.7/2)
Mk.527 (RDa.7/2)
Mk.528 (RDa.7/2)
Mk.529 (RDa.7/2)
Mk.530 (RDa.7/2)
Mk.531 (RDa.7/2)
Mk.551 (RDa.7)
Mk.552 (RDa-7)
Mk.540 (RDa.10)
Mk.541 (RDa.11)
Mk.542 (RDa.10/1)

Applications

Largely associated with the very successful Vickers Viscount medium-range airliner, it powered a number of other European and Japanese designs of the 1950s and 60s and was also used to convert American-manufactured piston aircraft to turboprop power. The list includes:
 Armstrong Whitworth AW.660 Argosy :  Medium-range transport
 Aviation Traders Accountant : Cancelled prototype airliner
 Avro 748 (Hawker Siddeley H.S. 748) : Feeder airliner.
 Avro Athena one prototype aircraft only  : Military trainer 
 Breguet Alizé :  Anti-submarine aircraft: Dart RDa 21 2099 hp with water/methanol injection
 Cavalier Turbo Mustang III
 Fairchild F-27 :  Small airliner, U.S. manufactured version of the Fokker F27 Friendship. Two versions: F27A and F27B
 Fairchild Hiller FH-227 : Airliner, U.S. manufactured version of the Fairchild F-27 featuring a stretched fuselage with increased passenger seating
 Fokker F27 Friendship :  Small airliner from Dutch aerospace and aviation manufacturer Fokker. The original model on which several other airliners were based (such as the abovementioned F-27 and FH-227).
 Grumman Gulfstream I (G-159) : Executive transport & small airliner.  Includes the stretched Grumman Gulfstream I-C (G-159C).
 Handley Page Dart Herald : Small airliner
 Hawker Siddeley Andover : Military transport
 NAMC YS-11 :  Short/medium range airliner (Japanese aircraft)
 Some Douglas DC-3 transport aircraft have been upgraded to use Darts. DC-3s in BEA service with this update were called Pionairs. Another conversion is the Conroy Turbo Three.
 Convair 600 and Convair 640 converted from Convair 240, Convair 340 and Convair 440 piston-powered aircraft:  Small airliners
 Boeing B-17F Flying Fortress : A unique one was converted by Aero-Flite Company with 4x Rolls-Royce Dart turboprop engines and was used for fire fighting.

Power output was around 1,500 hp (1,120 kW) in early versions, and close to twice that in later versions, such as those that powered the NAMC YS-11 airliner. Some versions of the engine were fitted with water methanol injection, which boosted power in hot and high altitude conditions.

Engines on display

A Rolls-Royce Dart is on public display at the Royal Air Force Museum Cosford.
A Rolls-Royce Dart is on display at the Rolls-Royce Heritage Trust  (Derby). 
A Rolls-Royce Dart is on public display at the Gatwick Aviation Museum.
A Rolls-Royce Dart is on public display at the National Air and Space Museum.
A Rolls-Royce Dart is on public display at Canadian Museum of Flight.
A Rolls-Royce Dart is on public display at the Australian National Aviation Museum.
A Rolls-Royce Dart is on public display at the Aviation Heritage Museum (Western Australia).
A Rolls-Royce Dart is on display at Brooklyn Technical High School

Specifications (Dart RDa.7)

See also

References

Notes

Bibliography

 Gunston, Bill. World Encyclopedia of Aero Engines. Cambridge, England. Patrick Stephens Limited, 1989. 
 Taylor, John W. R. Jane's All The World's Aircraft 1965–66. London: Sampson Low, Marston & Company Ltd, 1965.
 Taylor, John W. R. Jane's All The World's Aircraft 1982–83. London: Jane's Yearbooks, 1982. .
 Turner, P. St. John. Handbook of the Vickers Viscount. London: Ian Allan, 1968. .

External links

Vickers Viscount and RR Dart history
"The Story of the Dart" a 1953 Flight article
"Dart Development" a 1955 Flight article on the Dart
"Dart in Overhaul Shop photos" Fields Airmotive Dart Page with photos of Dart disassembled

Dart
1940s turboprop engines
Centrifugal-flow gas turbine engines